Moorefields is a historic plantation home located near Hillsborough, Orange County, North Carolina.  It was built about 1785, and consists of a two-story central block, three bays wide, with flanking one-bay wings in the Federal style.  The house features a shed porch with turned wooden posts.  It was built by soldier and judge Alfred Moore (1755-1810).

It was listed on the National Register of Historic Places in 1972.

References

External links

Historic American Buildings Survey in North Carolina
Houses on the National Register of Historic Places in North Carolina
Federal architecture in North Carolina
Houses completed in 1785
Hillsborough, North Carolina
Houses in Orange County, North Carolina
O'Moore family
National Register of Historic Places in Orange County, North Carolina
Plantation houses in North Carolina